William "Red" Anderson (December 13, 1910 — June 16, 1991) was a Canadian ice hockey player who played one game with the Boston Bruins in the National Hockey League, appearing in a playoff game on March 27, 1943 against the Montreal Canadiens. He was born in Tillsonburg, Ontario.

Career statistics

Regular season and playoffs

See also
List of players who played only one game in the NHL

External links

1910 births
1991 deaths
Boston Bruins players
Boston Olympics players
Canadian ice hockey defencemen
Cleveland Falcons players
Ice hockey people from Ontario
Johnstown Blue Birds players
London Tecumsehs players
Minneapolis Millers (AHA) players
Pittsburgh Shamrocks players
Rochester Cardinals players
Sportspeople from Tillsonburg
St. Paul Saints (AHA) players
Tulsa Oilers (AHA) players